Ransom (reprinted under the title Five Were Missing) is a 1966 thriller novel by Lois Duncan. Its plot follows a group of children who are kidnapped and held hostage on a school bus. It marked Duncan's first foray into the suspense and thriller genre, and was nominated for an Edgar Allan Poe Award.

Plot
Five students in Albuquerque, New Mexico are held hostage on a school bus by a gang of kidnappers. The criminals demand $15,000 ransoms for each child on the bus, which their respective parents scramble to produce while police attempt to free them. Meanwhile, the five youths attempt to find a way to escape the situation themselves.

Accolades
Nominated – Edgar Award (1967)

References

External links
Ransom at the Open Library

1966 American novels
Novels about child abduction
American thriller novels
American young adult novels
Novels by Lois Duncan
Doubleday (publisher) books